Ushakovo is a rural locality (a selo) and the administrative center of Ushakovsky Selsoviet of Shimanovsky District, Amur Oblast, Russia. The population was 475 as of 2018. There are 12 streets.

Geography 
Ushakovo is located on the Amur River, 112 km west of Shimanovsk (the district's administrative centre) by road. Novovoskresenovka is the nearest rural locality.

References 

Rural localities in Shimanovsky District